PREF mag or Préférences Mag was a French bimonthly gay magazine founded in March 2004. The magazine was part of Prefmag Editions. The headquarters was in Levallois-Perret. It was a competitor of the magazine Têtu. It was known for its high quality images among other attributes. Although it was a leading prominent and well selling publication for the gay communities it faced criticisms for being politically bland and not embracing non-consumeristic aspirations. They included some more risque content including supportive of LGBT families and open-marriages in line with that of modern French culture. They also were supportive of non-standard views of masculinity and how one's sexuality should conform to traditional models.

PREF mag ceased publication in March 2011.

See also
Illico

References

2004 establishments in France
2011 disestablishments in France
Bi-monthly magazines published in France
Cultural magazines
LGBT-related magazines published in France
French-language magazines
Gay men's magazines
Lifestyle magazines
Magazines established in 2004
Magazines disestablished in 2011
Magazines published in Paris